Alberto Batignani (born 30 September 1912, date of death unknown) was a Uruguayan water polo player. He competed in the men's tournament at the 1936 Summer Olympics. He was also a breaststroke swimmer.

References

External links
Picture of the Uruguay team

1912 births
Year of death missing
Uruguayan male water polo players
Olympic water polo players of Uruguay
Water polo players at the 1936 Summer Olympics
Place of birth missing